Gladys Morgen (died January 9, 1990) was an American politician. She served as a member of the Washington House of Representatives from the  5th district. Morgen was a member of the Democratic Party.

Life and career 
Morgen was born in North Dakota. She was a housewife.

In 1976, Morgen was appointed by Spokane County commissioners to represent the 5th district of the Washington House of Representatives, following the resignation of Edward T. Luders.

Morgen died in January 1990 in Tucson, Arizona, at the age of 73.

References 

Year of birth missing
1990 deaths
People from North Dakota
Democratic Party members of the Washington House of Representatives
20th-century American politicians
20th-century American women politicians
20th-century American women
Housewives